Rene Morgan La Montagne Sr. (1856–1910) was treasurer and director of E. Montagne's Sons, a champion polo player, and one of the founders of the Rockaway Hunt Club in Cedarhurst, New York on Long Island.

Biography
He was born in 1856 and he later married Laura L. Morgan. He had as his son, Rene Morgan La Montagne Jr. He died in 1910 of typhoid.

References

1856 births
1910 deaths
People from Cedarhurst, New York
Deaths from typhoid fever
American polo players